McCallister is a surname and a derivient of McAlister. Notable people with the surname include:

Sports
Blaine McCallister (born 1958), American golfer
Bob McCallister (born 1934), American golfer
Charles McCallister (1903–1997), American water polo player
Jack McCallister (1879–1946), American baseball coach

Others
John McCallister (born 1972), Northern Irish politician
Lon McCallister (1923–2005), American actor
Michael McCallister, American chief executive

Fictional characters
Kevin McCallister, protagonist from the first two films of the Home Alone franchise

See also
McCalister
McAlester (disambiguation), includes a list of people with surname McAlester